Charles W. Dana (June 27, 1837 – February 28, 1896) was an American politician who was a member of the 1862–63 California State Assembly, representing the 3rd District.

References

Members of the California State Assembly
1837 births
1896 deaths

19th-century American politicians